The Mu-like gpT Downstream Element RNA motif (Mu-gpT-DE RNA motif) is a conserved RNA structure that was discovered by bioinformatics.
The Mu-gpT-DE motif is only found in metagenomic sequences arising from unknown organisms.

Mu-gpT-DE RNAs usually occur downstream of genes whose protein products are similar to gpT.  gpT is a protein subunit of the phage head of phages similar to Bacteriophage Mu.  This and other observations suggest that Mu-gpT-DE RNAs are found in phages and prophages.  Some Mu-gpT-DE RNAs contain a stem that overlaps the Shine-Dalgarno sequence of the downstream gene, which could suggest a cis-regulatory function.  However, this phenomenon could also arise if Mu-gpT-DE RNAs are part of a tightly packed genome, as is common with phages.  Thus, Mu-gpT-DE RNAs might function as small RNAs.

References

Non-coding RNA